Aurelio Sousa y Matute (August 31, 1860 – February 26, 1925) was a Peruvian lawyer and politician. He was born in the Cajamarca Region of Peru. He graduated from the National University of San Marcos. He served in the Chamber of Deputies of Peru and was its president from 1899 to 1900. He also served in the Senate of Peru. He served as minister of justice (August 22–October 22, 1914), interior (June 17–July 27, 1913) and minister of economy and finance (September 22–November 11, 1914) in the Government of Peru. He was twice Prime Minister of Peru (June–July 1913, August–November 1914). He died in Nice, France.

References

Bibliography 
 Basadre Grohmann, Jorge: Historia de la República del Perú (1822–1933), Tomos 12 y 13. Editada por la Empresa Editora El Comercio S. A. Lima, 2005.  (V.12) –  (V.13)
 Tauro del Pino, Alberto: Enciclopedia Ilustrada del Perú. Tercera Edición. Tomo 15, SAL/SZY. Lima, PEISA, 2001. 

1860 births
1925 deaths
People from Cajamarca Region
19th-century Peruvian lawyers
Members of the Chamber of Deputies of Peru
Members of the Senate of Peru
Presidents of the Chamber of Deputies of Peru
Peruvian Ministers of Justice
Peruvian Ministers of Interior
Peruvian Ministers of Economy and Finance
National University of San Marcos alumni